John M. Millikin (October 14, 1804 – April 9, 1884) was a Republican politician in the state of Ohio and was Ohio State Treasurer from 1876-1878.

John Millikin was born October 14, 1804 in Greensboro Greene County, Pennsylvania. Three years later, his family moved to Hamilton, Ohio, his Son, Daniel Millikin becoming the first physician in that place. He had private teachers, and spent a year at Washington College in Washington County, Pennsylvania from 1824 and 1825.  He was admitted to the bar in Ohio September 5, 1827, and went into partnership with William Bebb. When Bebb was elected governor, Millikin retired from legal practice and moved to his farm three miles from Hamilton. He raised Poland China domestic pigs, and was the first president of the Ohio Poland-China Record Association, and was re-elected unanimously. He wrote the history of the breed.

Millikin was an officer in the State militia for several years, and was on Governor Thomas Corwin's staff. In 1846 he was a member of the state board of equalization, and spent three terms on the State Board of Agriculture. In 1860 he was named a trustee of Miami University for nine years, and was re-appointed twice more, serving until his death. In 1873 he was named by the Secretary of the Interior as a commissioner to make a treaty with the Creek to cede part of their territory to the Seminole. In 1875, he was elected Ohio State Treasurer, was re-nominated by the Republicans in 1877, but lost in the general election. He died April 9, 1884 at Hamilton. He was interred at Greenwood Cemetery (Hamilton, Ohio) on April 11, 1884.

Millikin was married to Mary Hough of Hamilton September 6, 1831. They had four children.

Notes

References

State treasurers of Ohio
Ohio Republicans
Ohio lawyers
Politicians from Hamilton, Ohio
1804 births
1884 deaths
Washington & Jefferson College alumni
Miami University trustees
19th-century American politicians
19th-century American lawyers